Torre Branca ("Branca Tower") is an iron panoramic tower located in Parco Sempione, the main city park of Milan, Italy.  It is 108.6 m high, which makes it the sixth highest structure in Milan after Unicredit Tower (231 m), Allianz Tower (209 m) Palazzo Lombardia (161 m), Pirellone or Pirelli Tower (127 m) and the Breda Tower (116 m). The top of the tower is a panoramic point whose view, on a clear day, may encompass the Milan cityline as well as the Alps, the Apennines, and part of the Po Valley.

History
The tower was designed by architect Gio Ponti and inaugurated in 1933, in the Fascist era during the 5th edition of the Milan Triennial. It was originally named "Torre Littoria" after fascio littorio, i.e., the fasces. After World War II it was renamed "Torre del Parco" ("park tower"). In 1972, access to the top of the tower was closed as the structure needed restoring. It was restructured in 2002 by the Branca liquor company, and thus renamed Torre Branca. Since 2002 it is again open to the public.

References

Buildings and structures in Milan
Tourist attractions in Milan
Towers in Italy
Towers completed in 1933
World's fair architecture in Italy
Italian fascist architecture